Ronald Moreton Grant OAM (born 1943) is an Australian long distance runner.

Running
In 1983, Ron Grant ran  around Australia in 217 days. He completed the run anticlockwise, starting in Brisbane, then Townsville, Mount Isa, Darwin, Perth, Adelaide, Melbourne, Sydney and back to Brisbane.

Recognition
Grant was named Queensland Sportsman of the Year in 1983.

He was named Queenslander of the Year in 1984.

He received a Medal of the Order of Australia in 1984.

See also
 List of people who have run across Australia

References

Further reading

External links
 Ron Grant, Australian Ultra Runners Association Inc

Australian male long-distance runners
Recipients of the Medal of the Order of Australia
1943 births
Living people